Edmond Albanach de Burgh, 1st Mac William Íochtar (born before 1315; died 1375) was an Irish chieftain and noble who established himself as the most powerful lord in Connacht west of the Shannon.

Early life

Edmond Albanach was the son of Sir William Liath de Burgh (d.1324). He acquired his nickname from the time he spent in Scotland from the spring of 1316 as a hostage for his father, after the latter's release by Robert the Bruce.

Mac William Íochtar

The murder of his brother, Walter Liath de Burgh, in 1332, directly led to the destruction of the de Burgh Earldom of Ulster and Lordship of Connacht. Warfare between the de Burgh factions climaxed with the murder of a cousin, Edmond de Burgh of Clanwilliam by Albanach at Lough Mask in 1338. Albanch was driven from Connacht for this, but gathered a fleet which harassed the coast of Connacht till he was delivered a royal pardon in March 1340. He was able to maintain himself as the most powerful lord west of the Shannon, over the O'Conor's and Clanricardes'.

Annalistic references

From the Annals of the Four Masters:

 M1335.4. The entire of the West of Connaught was desolated by Edmond Burke. Great evils were also wrought by him, both by burning and slaying, upon the son of the Earl and the race of Richard Burke. They afterwards made peace with one another.

Family and descendants

De Burgh had two wives, Sadhbh Ni Maillie, daughter of Diarmuid mac Owen Ó Máille, with whom he had one son:

 Thomas mac Edmond Albanach de Búrca, 2nd Mac William Íochtar, (d. 1402), married Una Ní Conchobair in 1397.

and Finola Ní Cellaigh with whom he may have fathered:

 William Saxonagh Bourke, died 1368
 Theobald, killed in 1374
 Richard, killed in 1377

Thomas de Burgh (d.1402) had five sons, each of whom succeeded each other in the Lordship of the Lower MacWilliam. The Fourth son was ancestor to the Earls of Mayo. His eldest son:-
 Walter de Burgh of Shruel (c1360- 1440) Lord of the Lower MacWilliam m. Sabia, a daughter of O'Brien, Lord of Thomond
his eldest son:-
 John of Shruel (1395–1445), acquired the property of Dromkeen, co. Limerick in 1420. m. a sister of the O'Brien.
his eldest son:-
 William 'The Black' or 'Dhue'(1418–1469) of Dromkeen m. Honore a daughter of one of his Clanricarde cousins
his eldest son:-
 Meyler (d.1495) Lord of Lebanon, succeeded by his son:- Richard (1465–1540) of Dromkeen, succeeded by his son:- Richard Og (1520–1595), succeeded by his son:- Ulick (b. 1575), succeeded by his son:- Richard (1600–1659), succeeded by his son:-
 Rt Rev Ulysees Burgh (1648–1693), Lord Bishop of Ardagh (Church of Ireland) m. Mary a daughter of Colonel William Kingsmill of Ballyowen co. Tipperary.
who had three sons:-
 Richard (b. 1666) of Dromkeen and Drumrusk, MP, whose estates were inherited by a cousin Walter Hussey who assumed the name Hussey de Burgh after the male line became extinct in 1778.
 Colonel Thomas de Burgh of Oldtown, MP. (1670–1730) Minister, Surveyor General of Ireland and architect of Trinity College Dublin Library. From him descend the de Burgh's of Oldtown.
 William de Burgh of Bert, MP (d. 1744) Comptroller and Accountant General for Ireland, grandfather of William de Burgh MP (1696–1754) Anti Slavery Campaigner.

Arms

Genealogy

 Sir Edmond Albanach de Burgh (d. 1375), 1st Mac William Íochtar (Lower Mac William), (Mayo)
 William de Burgh (d.1368)
 Thomas mac Edmond Albanach de Burca, 1375–1402, 2nd Mac William Íochtar
 Walter mac Thomas de Burca (d.1440), 3rd Mac William Íochtar
 Theobald Bourke (d.1503), 8th Mac William Íochtar
 Meiler Bourke (d.1520), 11th Mac William Íochtar
 Ricard Bourke (d.1509), 9th Mac William Íochtar
 Seaán an Tearmainn Bourke (alive 1527), 13th Mac William Íochtar
 Ricard mac Seaán an Tearmainn Bourke (d.1571), 16th Mac William Íochtar
 Edmund na Féasóige de Burca, (d.1458), 4th Mac William Íochtar
 Ricard Ó Cuairsge Bourke (d.1473), 7th Mac William Íochtar
 Edmond de Burca (d.1527), 10th Mac William Íochtar
 Walter de Burca
 Seaán de Burca
 Oliver de Burca
 Seaán mac Oliver Bourke (d.1580), 17th Mac William Íochtar
 Richard Bourke (d.1586), 19th Mac William Íochtar
 Walter Ciotach de Burca of Belleek (d.1590)
 Tibbot (Theobald) MacWalter Kittagh Bourke, 21st Mac William Íochtar, 1st Marquess of Mayo
 Walter (Balthasar) Bourke, 2nd Marquess of Mayo
 Thomas Ruadh de Burca
 Uilleag de Burca
 Edmond de Burca (d.1527), 12th Mac William Íochtar
 David de Burca (alive 1537), 15th Mac William Íochtar
 Richard the Iron Bourke (d.1583), 18th Mac William Íochtar
 Tibbot (Theobald) ne Long Bourke (1567-1629), 23rd Mac William Íochtar, 1st Viscount Mayo (1627)
 Viscounts Mayo
 William "the Blind Abbot" Bourke (d.1593), 20th Mac William Íochtar
 Theobald mac Uilleag Bourke (d.1537), 14th Mac William Íochtar
 Risdeárd de Burca
 Ricard Deamhan an Chorráin de Burca
 Risdeárd Mac Deamhan an Chorráin (Richard) "the Devils Hook" Bourke (d.1601), 22nd Mac William Íochtar
 Seaán de Burca (d.1456)
 Tomás Óg de Burca, (d.1460), 5th Mac William Íochtar
 Risdeárd de Burca (d.1473), 6th Mac William Íochtar

References
 Bourke family tree, p. 399, The History of Mayo, Hubert T. Knox, 1908
 Burgh, Sir Edmund Albanach de, David Beresford, in Dictionary of Irish Biography from the Earliest Times to the Year 2002, p. 3, Cambridge, 2010

People from County Mayo
14th-century Irish people
Edmond Albanach De
1375 deaths
Year of birth unknown
1315 births